The Primorskaya line was the second line constructed by the Primorskaya railway, near St. Petersburg, Russia. It is now part of the Oktyabrskaya Railway and was electrified in 1952.

History 

Its first stage was opened on July 12, 1894 - the line reached Lakhta. 
Second stage was opened on October 31, 1894; the railway left on coast of Gulf of Finland opposite to island Kotlin and was integrated with a steamship line. 
Later, November 26, the same year, the third turn of a railroad line was opened. 
The line reached a final point - the cities of Sestroretsk

Route
Only major stations are shown.
 Primorsky, 0 km
 Lakhta, 17.1 km
 Lisy Nos, 20.3 km
 Kaupilovo, 22.1 km
 Gorskaya, 24.0 km
 Tarkhovka, 26.5 km
 Sestroretsk, 35.1 km

See also 
 Connecting Line

References 

Oktyabrskaya Railway
1520 mm gauge railways in Russia